In Indonesian law, the term "city" is generally defined as the second-level administrative subdivision of the Republic of Indonesia, an equivalent to regency.  The difference between a city and a regency is that a city has non-agricultural economic activities and a dense urban population, while a regency comprises predominantly rural areas and is larger in area than a city.  However, Indonesia historically had several classifications of cities.

According to Kamus Besar Bahasa Indonesia, the official dictionary of Indonesian language, city (kota) is "a densely populated area with high density and modern facilities and most of the population works outside of agriculture."

Cities are divided into districts (Kecamatan, Distrik in Papua region, or Kemantren in Yogyakarta).

Historical classification

/municipality

and 
, used for a small urban area, was the third-level division below regency and province.

Jakarta was the only city granted the  status, due to its function as the capital of Indonesia.

Jakarta continued to become the only urban area with a province status.

The term  (administrative city, not to be confused with ) was used after the implementation of Act Number 5 of 1974.  status was granted to a town inside the territory of a regency that were deemed necessary in accordance with the town's growth and development.  does not have autonomy and its own legislature, and was responsible to its parent regency. The term  was abolished with the implementation of Act Number 22 of 1999, and all  were either granted full  (city) status or dissolved and merged with its parent regency.

The term  (city) has been implemented to substitute  since the post-Suharto era in Indonesia.  is headed by a mayor, who is directly elected via elections to serve for a five-year term, which can be renewed for one further five-year term.

Jakarta as a city

Jakarta, then known as Batavia, was the first city in the archipelago to be developed by the Dutch Empire.  On the 4 March 1621, the first city government was created in Batavia, and on 1 April 1905, it became the very first municipality of the Dutch East Indies. Upon Indonesian independence, it remains as the city within the province of West Java. With the release of the Act Number 1 of 1957, Jakarta became the first provincial-level city in Indonesia. Although Jakarta is now written as a 'province' in Indonesian law products, it is still widely referred to as a city. The United Nations (UN) classifies Jakarta as a 'city' on its statistical database.

The Special Capital Region of Jakarta consists of five 'administrative cities' and one 'administrative regency'. Unlike other actual cities in Indonesia, administrative cities in Jakarta are not self-governing, and were only created for bureaucracy purposes.  The administrative cities do not have city councils, and their mayors were exclusively selected by the Governor of Jakarta without any public election.  Ryas Rasyid, an Indonesian regional government expert, stated that Jakarta is a "province with a city management". Anies Baswedan, the 17th Governor of Jakarta, asserted that "Jakarta has only an area of 600 square kilometres.  It is a city with the province status." Unlike other 36 Indonesian provinces whose governors work in a 'governor office', the governor of Jakarta works in a city hall.

List of cities by date of incorporation

Notes
 Incorporated as Batavia
 Incorporated as Buitenzorg
 Incorporated as Fort de Kock
 Incorporated as Kutaraja
 Incorporated as Tanjungkarang–Telukbetung

See also

City status
List of Indonesian cities by population
List of Indonesian cities by GDP

References

 
Indonesia